General Clark may refer to:

Albert P. Clark (1913–2010), U.S. Air Force lieutenant general
Charles Clark (governor) (1811–1877), Mississippi State Troops major general in the American Civil War
Edward Clark (governor) (1815–1880), Confederate States Army brigadier general
Edwin N. Clark (1902–1982), U.S. Army Reserve brigadier general
George Clark (British Army officer) (1892–1948), British Army lieutenant general
George Rogers Clark (1752–1818), American Revolutionary War general
Harold L. Clark (1893–1973), U.S. Air Force brigadier general
John Bullock Clark Jr. (1831–1903), Confederate States Army brigadier general
John Arthur Clark (1886–1976), Canadian Expeditionary Force brigadier general
John Bullock Clark (1802–1885), Missouri State Guard brigadier general in the American Civil War
Lynwood E. Clark (born 1929), U.S. Air Force lieutenant general
Mark A. Clark (general) (fl. 1980s–2010s), U.S. Marine Major General
Mark W. Clark (1896–1984), World War II and the Korean War general
Meriwether Lewis Clark Sr. (1809–1881), Missouri State Guard brigadier general in the American Civil War
Richard M. Clark (born c. 1964), U.S. Air Force lieutenant general
Robert T. Clark (fl. 1970s–2000s), U.S. Army lieutenant general
Ronald P. Clark (fl. 1980s–2000s), U.S. Army lieutenant general
Samuel Findlay Clark (1909–1998), Canadian Army lieutenant general
Trudy H. Clark (born 1951), U.S. Air Force major general
Wesley Clark (born 1944), U.S. Army general, commander in the Kosovo War, author and political spokesman
William Leon Clark (1911–2005), U.S. Air Force brigadier general
William Thomas Clark (1831–1905), Union Army brigadier general and brevet major general

See also
Henri Jacques Guillaume Clarke (1765–1818), Marshal of France
Arthur Stanley-Clarke (1886–1983), British Army brigadier general
Henry Calvert Stanley-Clarke (1872–1943), British Army brigadier general
General Clarke (disambiguation)
Attorney General Clark (disambiguation)